Black Fox (Dr. Robert William Paine) is a fictional superhero appearing in American comic books published by Marvel Comics. The character's primary appearances have been in Marvel Comics' limited series, Marvel: The Lost Generation, debuting in issue #12 (March 2000).

Dr. Robert William Paine was born in the fictional city of Foxwood Farms, Illinois presumably in the early decades of the Twentieth Century. During World War II, Paine worked as an American intelligence agent and was assigned to infiltrate Nazi Germany. After the War, he took to living the life of a swashbuckler.

It was during this time that Paine was driven to create his Black Fox identity. After a conflict with the vampiric villain Nocturne, in which Paine's true love Miriam was slain, Paine declares, "Before, I was just a masked swashbuckler. After that...that was the day the Black Fox was truly born".

After many years of fighting crime, The Black Fox eventually retired to teach history and law at Northwestern University in Chicago.

He later came out of retirement to help the superhero team First Line repel a Skrull invasion of Earth. During the final battle against the Skrulls, most of the First Line team, including Black Fox, were killed.

Other versions
During the "Secret Wars" storyline, a version of Black Fox was seen residing in the Battleworld domain of the Deadlands as a zombie. He and the other zombies tried to catch an exiled version of Tigra only to come into conflict with some Ultron Sentinels.

References

External links
 Black Fox (Robert Paine) at Marvel Wiki

Comics characters introduced in 2000
Marvel Comics superheroes